Terence (Terry) Connolly (14 February 1958 – 25 September 2007) was an Australian politician and judge.

Early years
The son of an Irish bricklayer, Connolly was born in Adelaide and graduated with a Bachelor of Laws and Bachelor of Arts (both with Honours) from the University of Adelaide and a Masters in Public Law from the Australian National University.  He was registered to practise as a barrister and solicitor in South Australia in 1982 and worked with Justice John Gallop.  He moved to Canberra in 1983 and worked as a legal adviser in the Commonwealth departments of Attorney-General, Veterans' Affairs and Foreign Affairs.  He was registered to practise in the Australian Capital Territory in 1985.

Career
Connolly joined the Australian Labor Party in 1976 and was elected as South Australian President of Young Labor in 1978; and as National President in 1979.

Connolly became a Labor Member of the Australian Capital Territory Legislative Assembly in 1990 on the resignation of Paul Whalan and served as Attorney-General from 1991 to 1995.  With the creation of electorates in 1995, he became a member for Molonglo. Connolly also served as Minister for Housing and Community Services from 1991 to 1995 and Minister for Urban Services from 1992 to 1995.

He resigned from the Assembly in February 1996 and was appointed Master of the Australian Capital Territory Supreme Court. Connolly was appointed a judge of the ACT Supreme Court in January 2003.

Connolly died of a heart attack while cycling atop Red Hill in Canberra; and his family carried out his wishes to donate his organs for the benefit of others. He is survived by his wife, Dr Helen Watchirs, the ACT Human Rights Commissioner and their two daughters; Lara and Maddy.

References

1958 births
2007 deaths
Australian Labor Party members of the Australian Capital Territory Legislative Assembly
Australian public servants
Judges of the Supreme Court of the Australian Capital Territory
Members of the Australian Capital Territory Legislative Assembly
Fellows of the Australian Academy of Law
Attorneys-General of the Australian Capital Territory
Organ transplant donors
Australian National University alumni
20th-century Australian politicians